Lorena Gil (born 1975, Gijón, Asturias) is a Spanish politician who served as member of the General Junta of the Principality of Asturias from 2015 to 2020 and who lead Podemos Asturies into the 2019 regional elections in Asturias.

Biography 
Lorena Gil started her studies in English philology in the University of Oviedo but she later moved to finish it in the University of Bonn. She did an internship in the Bundestag. She later finished a degree in political sciences in the National University of Distance Education. Before joining politics she had worked at the Spanish Institute for Foreign Trade and industrial multinational DuPont. 

Almost after its funding, Gil joined Podemos and became an important figure in the party in Asturias. In the regional elections of 2015, she won a seat with the party in the General Junta of the Principality of Asturias. She became deputy spokesperson for the parliamentary group, something that gave her the sufficient importance inside the party to win the primaries for leader in 2018. She therefore lead Podemos Asturies into the 2019 regional elections, gaining four seats. Gil resigned in 2020 and left active politics. Her resignation happened at a time of important internal tensions in the party.

References 

1975 births
Living people